The Written Law is a 1931 British drama film directed by Reginald Fogwell and starring Madeleine Carroll, Percy Marmont and Henry Hewitt. It was shot at Elstree Studios. The screenplay concerns a man who is cured of blindness but conceals his recovery from his wife.

Cast
 Madeleine Carroll as Lady Margaret Rochester 
 Percy Marmont as Sir John Rochester 
 Henry Hewitt as Harry Carlisle 
 James Fenton as Doctor Rawlinson 
 Barbara Barlowe as Celia

References

Bibliography
 Low, Rachael. Filmmaking in 1930s Britain. George Allen & Unwin, 1985.
 Wood, Linda. British Films, 1927-1939. British Film Institute, 1986.

External links

1931 films
1931 drama films
Films directed by Reginald Fogwell
British drama films
British black-and-white films
Films shot at Imperial Studios, Elstree
1930s English-language films
1930s British films
Ideal Film Company films